Hippopsicon montanum is a species of beetle in the family Cerambycidae. It was described by Quentin and Villiers in 1981.

References

Agapanthiini
Beetles described in 1981